This is a comprehensive discography of Bad Brains, a Washington, D.C.-based hardcore punk band that also plays reggae and uses styles of funk and heavy metal into their music. To date, the band has released nine full-length studio albums (including an instrumental dub album), four EPs, four live recordings, one compilation album, one demo album, and more than a dozen singles.

Studio albums

Live albums

Compilation albums

Demo albums

Extended plays

Singles

Music videos

Other appearances
 Let Them Eat Jellybeans! (Alternative Tentacles LP, 1981) featured the 45 version of "Pay to Cum"
 New York Thrash (ROIR cassette, 1982) featured the songs "Regulator" and "Big Takeover" from Bad Brains 
 Rat Music for Rat People (CD Presents, 1982) (Songs "How Low Can a Punk Get?" and "You")
 Pump Up the Volume Motion Picture Soundtrack (1990) (Song "Kick Out the Jams" with Henry Rollins)
 H.R. appeared on the song "Without Jah, Nothin'" by P.O.D., track 13 on the 2001 album Satellite.
 H.R. also appeared on the song "New Sun" on Long Beach Dub All-Stars' debut album Right Back (1999).
 The band contributed the  music of "Re-Ignition" to a remix of Lil Jon's "Real Nigga Roll Call".
 "I Against I" appeared in the video game Matt Hoffman's Pro BMX 2 as well as EA's Skate.
 "Soul Craft" was featured in the video game Backyard Wrestling 2.
 "Banned in D.C." appeared in the video game Tony Hawk's Proving Ground.
 "Banned in D.C." also appeared in the video game Saints Row.
 "Right Brigade" appeared in the video game Grand Theft Auto IV.
 A considerable part of the punk documentary American Hardcore (2006) is devoted to Bad Brains.
 H.R. and Darryl Jenifer contributed to "Riya" on rapper Ill Bill's album The Hour of Reprisal.
 "Re-Ignition" is heavily sampled on drum and bass producer Hive's "Ultrasonic Sound."

References

External links
 
 Entry at 45cat.com

Punk rock group discographies
Reggae discographies
Discographies of American artists
Discography
Heavy metal group discographies